Shimon Alcoby, who performs and records music as Shimon, is an English DJ, record producer, and founder of AudioPorn Records. Shimon is also affiliated with the drum and bass record label Ram Records, and has published music through Ram since its inception in 1992. Shimon is one third of Ram Trilogy, a collective which also includes Andy C and Ant Miles.

Shimon's solo record production work includes the singles "The Predator", "Hush Hush", and "The Shadow Knows". The single "Body Rock" reached number 28 in the UK Singles Chart on 6 January 2002.

In 2006, Shimon was asked by Novation Digital Music Systems to produce sounds for their Xio Synth. Shimon is also a breaks producer with releases on Finger Lickin' Records such as "I Like You", "Around the Edge", and "White Noise".

In 2007, Shimon began releasing tracks on his own record label, AudioPorn Records, and was featured as the cover artist in Kmag in December of that year. He was also responsible for the mix CD AudioPorn that was issued with the magazine.

References

External links
 Shimon on Myspace

Living people
English drum and bass musicians
DJs from Manchester
English record producers
Electronic dance music DJs
Year of birth missing (living people)
RAM Records artists